Sergio Lira may refer to:

Sergio A. Lira, Brazilian-born American immunologist
Sergio Lira (footballer) (born 1957), Mexican football player and coach